Fire Party was a band from Washington, D.C. They were together from the autumn of 1986 to the spring of 1990.  The band members were Amy Pickering (vocals), Natalie Avery (guitar), Kate Samworth (bass), and Nicky Thomas (drums).

History
Pickering had been involved in the D.C. hardcore scene as a high school student at H-B Woodlawn. She then went on to work at Dischord Records.  On her first day of work there, she tore down a sign that said "No Skirts Allowed".

Pickering joined with Avery, Samworth, and Thomas to form Fire Party which, according to  Avery, "grew out of this really tight-knit group of people very much shaped by a very small music scene". Before Thomas joined Fire Party, she had previously played in bands such as Lebensluste and In Pieces. The band made their debut on February of 1987 at d.c. space and their set was dedicated to the recently deceased Toni Young, a former member of the bands Red C and Dove, as well as one of the few women of color in the D.C. punk scene at the time.

Oman Emmet, previously known as Tomas Squip, has named Amy Pickering as "the mother of the revolution" for her role in what became known as Revolution Summer. 

Fire Party released a six-song self-titled mini-LP, an eight-song album (New Orleans Opera) while together. They played some Midwest shows with Scream, and in early 1988, they toured Europe with them and also supported That Petrol Emotion. While in Europe, they recorded a session for John Peel's BBC Radio 1 show. File 13, a punk fanzine from Massachusetts, referred to Fire Party as "one of the most powerful groups around today" in a review of New Orleans Opera, which the zine also cited as one of its favorite releases of 1989.

A self-titled compilation of the tracks from their two albums plus their Peel session and "Pilate" from the State of the Union compilation was released by Dischord in 1996.

Despite their small discography, Fire Party, along with related "Revolution Summer" bands like Embrace and Rites of Spring, had a lasting influence on the artistic direction of American punk. Apart from being an all-female band, a rarity in punk music at the time, drummer Nicky Thomas was also one of the few African American women involved in the punk music scene. Jenny Toomey, musician and co-founder of the Simple Machines record label, described Fire Party as "the world's first female-fronted emo band."

"Revolution Summer" had been a phrase Pickering used in notes she sent out to people in the D.C. punk scene to reflect "a climax, the end of something" and to re-inspire punks in D.C. It led to events like the punk percussion protest which protested Apartheid in South Africa and President Ronald Reagan. Tomas Squip of Beefeater credited Pickering with "setting a season into motion."

Discography
Fire Party mini-LP (May 1988), Dischord
New Orleans Opera mini-LP/cassette (October 1989), Dischord

Compilations
Fire Party CD (October 1996), Dischord - compiles both albums with five additional tracks

Notes

References

Greenwald, Andy. Nothing Feels Good : Punk Rock, Teenagers, and Emo. 1st ed., St. Martin's Griffin, 2003.
Strong, Martin C. (2003) The Great Indie Discography, Canongate,

External links
Fire Party page on Southern Records
Fire Party page on Dischord Records

All-female punk bands
American emo musical groups
Punk rock groups from Washington, D.C.
Dischord Records artists
First-wave emo bands
Musical groups established in 1986
Musical groups disestablished in 1990
1986 establishments in Washington, D.C.
Proto-riot grrrl bands